Vasile Botnari (born 22 July 1975) is a Moldovan economist and politician. From May 2018 until June 2019 he was the Director of the Information and Seurity Agency of the Republic of Moldova. He was the Minister of Informational Technologies and Communications of Moldova from January 20, 2016 - February 15, 2017. Previously, since May 31, 2013 was the Minister of Transport and Road Infrastructure of the Republic of Moldova on by  July 30, 2015, afterwards being replaced by Anatol Șalaru and then succeeded by Iurie Chirinciuc.

He is married and has two children. Besides Romanian, he also knows Russian and English.

References

1975 births
Living people
Democratic Party of Moldova politicians
People from Strășeni District
Government ministers of Moldova
21st-century Moldovan economists